Tiaraway (often stylized as tiaraway) was a Japanese voice actress duo consisting of Saeko Chiba and Yuuka Nanri.

Biography 
Tiaraway started out as a fix-termed voice actress duo in 2003, formed after the pair had recorded a song for the anime Memories Off 2nd.

The group released three singles and one album before holding their first (and final) live concert on 6 March 2005, the same day they announced that Tiaraway would be dissolved.

After the disbandment, the two members now concentrate on their own work: for Chiba voice-acting, and Nanri singing.

Discography

Singles

Albums

Appearances

Radio 
 (October 2003—September 2004)
 (January 2002)

References

Japanese pop music groups
Musical groups established in 2003
Anime musical groups